Herring Point (‘Nos Herring’ \'nos 'he-ring\) is a point on the north coast of Rugged Island off the west coast of Byers Peninsula of Livingston Island in the South Shetland Islands, Antarctica forming the east side of the entrance to Hersilia Cove.

The point is named after the English Captain Joseph Herring whose ship the Espirito Santo set the beginning of Antarctic sealing south of 60° south latitude in Hersilia Cove on Christmas Day 1819.

Location
British mapping in 1968, detailed Spanish mapping in 1992, and Bulgarian mapping in 2005 and 2009.

Maps
 Península Byers, Isla Livingston. Mapa topográfico a escala 1:25000. Madrid: Servicio Geográfico del Ejército, 1992.
 L.L. Ivanov et al. Antarctica: Livingston Island and Greenwich Island, South Shetland Islands. Scale 1:100000 topographic map. Sofia: Antarctic Place-names Commission of Bulgaria, 2005.
 L.L. Ivanov. Antarctica: Livingston Island and Greenwich, Robert, Snow and Smith Islands. Scale 1:120000 topographic map.  Troyan: Manfred Wörner Foundation, 2009.

References
 Herring Point. SCAR Composite Gazetteer of Antarctica.
 Bulgarian Antarctic Gazetteer. Antarctic Place-names Commission. (details in Bulgarian, basic data in English)

External links
 Herring Point. Copernix satellite image

Headlands of the South Shetland Islands
Bulgaria and the Antarctic